The Changsha Library is a public library located at Beichen Delta, in Kaifu District, Changsha, Hunan. Changsha Library has a collection of over 1 million items, with 31 thousand newspapers, 42 thousand audiovisual literatures, 8,900 ancient books, and 13 thousand local documents.

History
Changsha Library was formed in 1960 at Dingwangtai, in downtown Changsha.

In December 2015, the new building of Changsha Library was officially opened to the public.

References

External links
   
   

Buildings and structures in Changsha
Public libraries in China
1960 establishments in China
Libraries established in 1960
Education in Changsha
Kaifu District, Changsha